"Do You Compute?" is a song by American rock musician Donnie Iris from his 1983 album Fortune 410. The song was released as a single the same year and reached #64 on the U.S. Billboard Hot 100 chart and #20 on the U.S. Billboard Mainstream Rock Tracks chart.

The song was made as a promotional musical advert for the Atari 1200XL computer. The music video for the song strongly features the computer, including Iris typing on it and his band performing inside of it.

Charts

References

Donnie Iris songs
1983 singles
1983 songs
Songs written by Mark Avsec
Songs written by Donnie Iris
MCA Records singles